Ann Meyers Drysdale (born Ann Elizabeth Meyers; March 26, 1955) is an American former basketball player and sportscaster. She was a standout player in high school, college, the Olympic Games, international tournaments, and the professional levels.

Meyers was the first player to be part of the U.S. national team while still in high school. She was the first woman to be signed to a four-year athletic scholarship for college, at UCLA. She was also the first woman to sign a contract with a National Basketball Association team, the Indiana Pacers (1979), for $50,000. Her USA World Champion team member Lusia "Lucy" Harris-Stewart was technically the first and only woman to be drafted by an NBA team—the New Orleans Jazz's seventh-round pick in 1977—though she never intended to attend tryouts. Denise Long, from Iowa, was the first woman to be drafted by an NBA team—the San Francisco Warriors' thirteenth-round pick in 1969—but the NBA commissioner voided the pick because the Warriors had no intention of playing her alongside men, so Harris-Stewart is technically the one and only woman drafted by an NBA team and Meyers was the first to sign an NBA contract.

Previously a resident of Rancho Mirage, California, Meyers currently resides in Huntington Beach, California. She was president and general manager for the WNBA's Phoenix Mercury and a vice president for the NBA's Phoenix Suns. She is currently a vice president for the Phoenix Mercury and a color analyst for the Phoenix Suns television broadcasts. For over 26 years, she served as a network television sports analyst for TNT, ESPN, CBS, and NBC. Meyers is a board member for the Lott IMPACT Trophy, which is named after Pro Football Hall of Fame defensive back Ronnie Lott, and is given annually to college football's Defensive IMPACT Player of the Year. In 1993, Meyers was one of the first women players inducted into the Basketball Hall of Fame, and in the inaugural class at the Women's Basketball Hall of Fame in 1999. She was inducted into the FIBA Hall of Fame in 2007.

Early life
Meyers was born on March 26, 1955, the sixth of Patricia and Bob Meyers' 11 children. Her father played guard for Marquette University, then for the Shooting Stars, a professional team in Milwaukee, Wisconsin. One of her brothers, Dave, was an All-American at UCLA and went on to play for the Milwaukee Bucks.

Athletic accomplishments

High school
Meyers attended Cornelia Connelly High School and then later Sonora High School in La Habra, California, where she was able to engage in more competitive play. As an all-around athlete, she lettered in seven sports, including in softball, badminton, field hockey, tennis, and basketball. She earned thirteen Most Valuable Player awards in high school sports. She led her basketball teams to an 80–5 record. In 1974, Meyers became the first high school student to play for the U.S. national team.

College
Meyers was a four-year athletic scholarship player for the UCLA Bruins women's basketball team (1974–1978), the first woman to be so honored at any university. In a game against Stephen F. Austin on February 18, 1978, she recorded the first quadruple-double in NCAA Division I basketball history, with 20 points, 14 rebounds, 10 assists and 10 steals. Since then, only four Division I players, three female and one male, have done so. On March 25, 1978, her UCLA Bruins team was the AIAW national champion: UCLA defeated Maryland, 90–74 at Pauley Pavilion. While at UCLA (1976–1979), she became the first four-time All-American women's basketball player. She was the winner of the Honda Sports Award as outstanding women's college basketball player of the year, as well as the Broderick Cup for outstanding woman athlete of the year in 1978. As of 2008, she still holds UCLA career records for season steals (125), career steals (403), and career blocked shots (101).

UCLA statistics
Source

Olympics and world competition
Meyers was a member of the US team that won the 1975 Pan American Games Gold medal. She played on the US Olympic basketball team that won a silver medal in the 1976 Summer Olympics in Montreal. That team was led by Billie Moore, her own coach at UCLA. She was on the 1979 US team that won the 1979 FIBA World Championship for Women Gold medal. This was the first time since 1957 that the United States won a World Championship title. She also won silver medals at the 1979 Pan American Games and 1977 World University Games.

Meyers was named to the team representing the US at the 1979 William Jones Cup competition in Taipei, Taiwan.  The USA team won all six games en route to the gold medal.

Professional
In 1980, Meyers made NBA history when she signed a $50,000 no-cut contract with NBA's Indiana Pacers. She participated in three-day tryouts for the team, the first by any woman for the NBA, but eventually was not chosen for the final squad. She became a color analyst for the team at a time when there were very few women in sportscasting.
Meyers was the first woman player drafted by the Women's Professional Basketball League (WPBL) in 1978 to the New Jersey Gems. Playing for the Gems, Meyers was the WPBL Co-MVP for the 1979–1980 season. She wore jersey No. 15 for the Gems. She entered the inaugural Women Superstars competition in 1979, finishing fourth, but then went on to win the next three consecutive years: 1980, 1981, and 1982. Meyers served as an analyst for NBC Sports coverage of women's basketball at the 2008, 2012 and 2016 Summer Olympics.

Honors and Hall of Fame inductions
 1978—Winner of the Honda award for basketball
 1978—The Honda-Broderick Cup winner for all sports.
 Meyers received her first Hall of Fame membership in 1985, when she was inducted into the International Women's Sports Hall of Fame in the contemporary category for basketball.
 She was inducted into the UCLA Athletics Hall of Fame in 1988 as the first woman inductee.
 Her No. 15 basketball jersey was one of the first four retired by UCLA. She was honored on February 3, 1990, in a ceremony in Pauley Pavilion, along with Denise Curry (#12), Kareem Abdul-Jabbar (#33), and Bill Walton (#32). This was the key moment in the "Pauley at 25" celebration of twenty-five years of the arena. The primary criteria for being chosen was that all four players were three-time All-Americans.
 On May 10, 1993, she was enshrined in the Naismith Memorial Basketball Hall of Fame, located in Springfield, Massachusetts.
 In 1994, Meyers was the first woman ever to compete in the Celebrity Golf Association Championship.
 On January 31, 1995, she attended a ceremony in the gym of her high school, Sonora High School, in La Habra, California, where her player jersey was officially retired, and hung in display
 She was inducted into the National High School Hall of Fame in 1995.
 In 1999, Meyers received the Mel Greenberg Media Award, presented by the WBCA.
 On June 5, 1999, she was inducted as a charter member of the Women's Basketball Hall of Fame, in Knoxville, Tennessee.
 In 2001, Meyers was honored as a Wooden All-Time All-American by the Wooden award.
 She was a 2003 NCAA Silver Anniversary Awards recipient. She joins William Naulls (1981), Kareem Abdul-Jabbar (1994), and Bill Walton (1999) as UCLA athletes who have been so honored on the 25th anniversary of a major athletic accomplishment.
 In 2007, she was enshrined in the FIBA Hall of Fame as part of the inaugural class of 2007. She is 1 of 3 United States citizens, along with male player Bill Russell and coach Dean Smith so honored.
 Ann has been involved with Special Olympics for more than 30 years and currently serves as a Sports Ambassador for Special Olympics Southern California.

Family
On November 1, 1986, she married former Los Angeles Dodger Baseball Hall of Fame pitcher Don Drysdale, and took the name Ann Meyers Drysdale. It was the first time that a married couple were members of their respective sports' Halls of Fame. They had three children: sons Don Jr. (DJ) and Darren, and daughter Drew.

Meyers was widowed on July 3, 1993, when Drysdale died of a heart attack in Montreal, Quebec, Canada.

Meyers was the sister of former NBA player Dave Meyers, who also played college basketball and was an All-American at UCLA, under coach John Wooden. He played four seasons for the NBA's Milwaukee Bucks.

Broadcasting career
Meyers has been the women's basketball analyst at the Summer Olympics since the NBC's coverage of the 2000 Sydney Olympics for NBC Sports. She was offered a job to broadcast the Chicago Bulls games in 1993, but she turned it down due to family considerations.

She served as an analyst on ESPN's coverage of the WNBA and previously worked for NBC Sports full-time as its lead WNBA analyst from 1997 to 2002. Meyers also worked "Hoop-It-Up" telecasts in 1994 and 1995. Since 1983, she has served as an ESPN analyst for various events including both men's and women's NCAA basketball games.

She also worked as a color analyst for the Indiana Pacers making her the first woman to do game analysis for the team. On July 11, 2018, she announced her retirement from the Phoenix Suns broadcasting team as the color analyst.

Meyers led the U.S. to a silver medal at the 1976 Olympic Games in Montreal as women's basketball made its Olympic debut, and returned eight years later as an announcer for ABC Sports at the 1984 Summer Olympics in Los Angeles. She has since covered a wide variety of sports for major networks in the U.S, including the 1986, 1990 and 1994 Goodwill Games, men's and women's college basketball, and NCAA softball and volleyball.

In 2012, she joined Phoenix Suns broadcasting as a color analyst.

See also
 List of Silver Anniversary Awards (NCAA) Recipients
 Don Drysdale
 UCLA Bruins women's basketball

Notes

References

Bibliography 

 UCLA Bruins Women's basketball media guide (PDF copy available at www.uclabruins.com)
 UCLA Bruins Athletic Hall of Fame Inductees
 Basketball Hall of Fame Profile: Ann Meyers
 FIBA Hall of Fame: Ann Meyers
 Women's Basketball Hall of Fame: Inaugural class of 1999
 WBL Memories: New Jersey Gems

External links
 Ann Meyers weblog

1955 births
Living people
All-American college women's basketball players
American women's basketball players
Basketball players at the 1975 Pan American Games
Basketball players at the 1976 Summer Olympics
Basketball players at the 1979 Pan American Games
Basketball players from San Diego
College basketball announcers in the United States
FIBA Hall of Fame inductees
Indiana Pacers announcers
Medalists at the 1976 Summer Olympics
Medalists at the 1977 Summer Universiade
Medalists at the 1979 Pan American Games
Naismith Memorial Basketball Hall of Fame inductees
Olympic silver medalists for the United States in basketball
Pan American Games gold medalists for the United States
Pan American Games medalists in basketball
Pan American Games silver medalists for the United States
Phoenix Suns announcers
People from Rancho Mirage, California
Shooting guards
Sportspeople from Huntington Beach, California
Sportspeople from Riverside County, California
UCLA Bruins women's basketball players
UCLA Bruins women's volleyball players
United States women's national basketball team players
Universiade medalists in basketball
Universiade silver medalists for the United States
Women's National Basketball Association announcers
Women's National Basketball Association general managers
Women sports announcers
Women's Professional Basketball League players